{{DISPLAYTITLE:C7H15Cl2N2O4P}}
The molecular formula C7H15Cl2N2O4P (molar mass: 293.084762 g/mol) may refer to:

 Carboxycyclophosphamide
 Perfosfamide

Molecular formulas